National highway or National Highway may refer to:

 National Highways (England)
 National Highway (Australia)
 List of National Roads in Belgium 
 Brunei National Roads System                       
 National Highway System (Canada)
 Trans-Canada Highway
 Yellowhead Highway
 China National Highways
 Danish national road network
 Route nationale 
Bundesstraßen
 National highways of India
 National primary road
 National secondary road
 State highway (Italy)
 National highways of Japan
 List of National Roads in Latvia
 Malaysian Federal Roads System
 Mexican Federal Highway
 New Zealand state highway network
 Norwegian National Road
 National Highways of Pakistan                      
 National roads in Poland   
 Russian federal highways
 National routes (South Africa)
 National highways of South Korea
 List of national roads in Spain
 Swedish national road
 Turkish State Highway System
 State Highways (Ukraine)
 National Routes of Uruguay

United States 
 National Highway System (United States)
 United States Numbered Highways
 National Road
 National Old Trails Road

See also 
Highway systems by country
List of controlled-access highway systems
National road (disambiguation)